Honorio Delgado Espinosa (born Arequipa, 26 September 1892 - died Lima, 28 November 1969) was a gifted teacher, a creative researcher, a humanist, a philosopher, a linguist, and scholar whose work covered almost 50 years of the 20th-century history of Latin American psychiatry.  Born in Arequipa, Peru, Delgado graduated from Lima's School of Psychology at the National University of San Marcos.

Biography

The early part of Delgado's career was marked by an enthusiastic adherence to Sigmund Freud's psychoanalytic principles and included a frequent correspondence with the founder of psychoanalysis that extended until the late 1930s, long after Delgado had distanced himself ideologically from Freud. By the mid-1930s, Delgado had developed a major interest in phenomenology.  He also systematically pioneered biological innovations in the treatment of psychiatric disorders. For instance, he introduced the use of sodium nucleinate in the management of psychotic agitation in 1917 and the use of phenobarbital for the control of seizures in 1919. He was also the first in Latin America to apply malaria therapy in the treatment of general paresis and the use of chlorpromazine in the treatment of schizophrenia.  In 1957, he was one of the co-founders of the prestigious Collegium Internationale Neuro-Psychopharmacologicum in Zurich.

Delgado was a member of the exclusive Real Academia Española, headquartered in Madrid. He authored more than 450 articles and two dozen books on topics such as personality and character, the rehumanization of scientific culture, the spiritual formation of the individual, and ecology and existentialism. He co-founded, in 1918, the first psychiatric journal in Latin America, Revista de Psiquiatria y Disciplinas Conexas, the predecessor of the contemporary Revista de Psiquiatria. In 1953, he published a textbook of psychiatry that ultimately produced seven editions.

As Chairman of the Department of Psychiatry at San Marcos University for almost 30 years, Delgado recruited and mentored a group of very talented academicians and researchers that came to be known across Latin America as the Peruvian School of Psychiatry. One of his most notable contributions to the field of psychopathology was the description of three fundamental concepts in the pathogenesis of schizophrenia: the disjunction between the inner and outer world of the patient (autism), the disjunction of the ego with respect to the content of consciousness, and the breakdown of basic categories of knowledge. He also anticipated the crucial role of attention and cognition in the phenomenology of schizophrenia, a process that he called atelesis, or the failure in the intentionality of thought (1). However, Delgado's most visionary contribution was his anticipation of the development of the current psychiatric nomenclature, represented by the DSM series. Since the early 1950s, he had advocated the use of accurate descriptive diagnostic criteria, free of ideological biases and based on a multifactorial causality, with appropriate recognition of the biological basis of mental illness and of the hierarchization of descriptive criteria. At the same time, he emphasized the need for research to demonstrate diagnostic validity and for the recognition of different level of operations of the human psyche.

Delgado's objective and critical approach to psychiatry and psychopathology, his integrative and humanistic approach to treatment, and his clinical/academic scope and strict technical conceptualization of scientific terminology were paralleled only by his legendary teaching abilities and the respect he has earned from generations of Latin American psychiatrists. His legacy goes beyond the borders of Latin America to join those of psychiatric leaders across the world.

References

 1. Alarcon RD: Vigencia del pensamiento de Honorio Delgado en la psiquiatria contemporanea. Revista de Neuro-Psiquiatria 1982; 3:127-151
 2. American Psychiatry Association Honorio Delgado, M.D., 1892–1969

External links 

1892 births
1969 deaths
People from Arequipa
Peruvian psychiatrists
Peruvian philosophers
Grand Crosses 1st class of the Order of Merit of the Federal Republic of Germany
History of psychiatry
20th-century philosophers